Wayne is a county in the Commonwealth of Pennsylvania. It is part of Northeastern Pennsylvania. The county's population was 51,155 at the 2020 census. The county seat is the Borough of Honesdale. The county was formed from part of Northampton County on March 21, 1798, and was named for the Revolutionary War General Anthony Wayne.

The Lehigh River, a  tributary of the Delaware River, rises in southern Wayne County.

Geography

The terrain of the county is varied. In the wider northern half, the land is rugged along its border with New York State, while the southern  portion tends to be swampier. Higher hills and mountains are predominantly found along the county's western edge, while lower ones are more common in the east, near the Delaware River. The middle section of Wayne County is a wide plain.

The highest elevation in the county, 2,659 ft (810 m), is the summit of Mount Ararat in Orson. Two other summits at the north end of the same ridge also exceed 2,640 ft (800 m) in elevation. The county's lowest point, at approximately 680 ft (210 m) above sea level, is along the Delaware, near Wayne County's border with Pike County, Pennsylvania.

Most of Wayne County is drained by the Delaware (which separates Pennsylvania from New York), with the exception of a few small areas in the western part of the county, which are drained by either the Starrucca Creek or the Lackawanna River (which both eventually flow into the Susquehanna River).

The county has a warm-summer humid continental climate (Dfb) and average monthly temperatures in Honesdale range from 22.8 °F in January to 67.9 °F in July.

Adjacent counties
Broome County, New York (north)
Sullivan County, New York (east)
Delaware County, New York (northeast)
Pike County (southeast)
Monroe County (south)
Lackawanna County (southwest)
Susquehanna County (west)

Major highways

Demographics

As of the Census of 2010, there were 52,822 people, 20,625 households, and 13,952 families in Wayne County. The county's population density was 72.797 people per square mile (28.107/km2), and there were 31,653 housing units at an average density of 43.623/sq mi (16.843/km2). The racial makeup of the populace was 94.2% White, 3.1% African American, 0.2% Native American, 0.5% Asian, 0.0% Pacific Islander, 0.9% of other races, and 1.1% of two or more races. Hispanics and Latinos of all races made up 3.4% of the population.

67.6% of Wayne County's households were families, 53.9% were headed by a heterosexual married couple (Pennsylvania did not allow same-sex marriage until May 20, 2014, after the 2010 Census had been completed), and 26.6% included children under the age of 18. 9.2% of households were headed by a female householder with no husband present, 4.5% by a male householder with no wife present, and 32.4% consisted of non-families. 27.2% of all households were made up of individuals, and 12.3% consisted of a person 65 years of age or older living alone. The average household size was 2.38 and the average family size was 2.87.

Wayne County's age distribution was 21.1% under the age of 18, 4.5% between the ages of 18 and 24, 23.1% between 25 and 44, 32.4% between 45 and 64, and 19.0% 65 years of age or older. The population's median age was 45.9 years. For every 100 females, there were 110 males. For every 100 females age 18 and over, there were 112 males in the same age range.

According to American Community Survey (ACS) estimates, the median income for a household in Wayne County in 2013 was $49,313, and the median income for a family was $58,934. Males had a median income of $36,173, while females had a median income of $23,636. The per capita income for the county was $24,005. 8.4% of families and 12.2% of people were below the Census Bureau's poverty thresholds (different from the federally defined poverty guidelines), including 18.5% of those under age 18 and 7.6% of those age 65 or over.

According to self-reported ancestry figures recorded by the ACS, the five largest ancestral groups in Wayne County in 2013 were Germans (30.3%), Irish (22.1%), Italians (13.9%), English (10.9%), and Poles (10.1%). Those reporting American ancestry made up 8.6% of the population.

2020 Census

Politics

|}

As of October 28, 2016, there were 33,683 registered voters in Wayne County, with the following party breakdown:

Republican: 18,116 (53.78%)
Democratic: 10,152 (30.14%)
Libertarian: 211 (0.63%)
Green: 92 (0.27%)
Other: 5,112 (15.18%)

Wayne has long been one of the most Republican counties in Pennsylvania, as Republicans consistently win easily in federal, state and local elections. In 2000, Republican George W. Bush won 59.21 percent of the vote to Democrat Al Gore's 36.50 percent, and in 2004, Bush won with 62.43 percent to Democrat John Kerry's 36.69 percent. In 2008, Republican John McCain won with 55.39 percent of the vote to Democrat Barack Obama's 43.14 percent, and in 2012, Republican Mitt Romney won with 59.50 percent to Obama's 38.74 percent. In 2016, Republican Donald J. Trump won with 67.63 percent to Hillary Clinton's 29.18 percent.

Wayne County was one of the four counties that Barry Goldwater won in Pennsylvania in 1964; the last Democrat to win a plurality in the county was Grover Cleveland in 1892. Since then, only three Democrats have won even forty percent of the county's vote – William Jennings Bryan in 1900, Lyndon Johnson in 1964 and Obama in 2008.

Government and infrastructure

United States senators
Bob Casey, Jr. (senior senator), Democrat 
John Fetterman (junior senator), Democrat

United States representative
Matt Cartwright, Democrat (PA-8)

State representatives
Jonathan Fritz, Republican (111th district) - Buckingham, Clinton (partially), Lebanon, Manchester, Mount Pleasant, Oregon, Preston, and Scott Townships, and Starrucca Borough
Michael Peifer, Republican (139th district) - Berlin, Cherry Ridge, Clinton (partially), Damascus, Dyberry, Palmyra, Paupack, South Canaan, and Texas Townships, and Bethany, Hawley, Honesdale, and Prompton Boroughs

State senator
Lisa Baker, Republican  (20th district)

County commissioners
Brian W. Smith, Republican (Chairman)
Joseph Adams, Republican
Jocelyn Cramer, Democrat

Other county officers
Auditors: Carla J. Komar, Republican; Kathy Schloesser, Democrat; Catherine Jane Rickard, Republican
Coroner: Edward R. Howell, Republican
District Attorney: A.G. Howell, Republican
Prothonotary: Edward "Ned" Sandercock, Republican
Recorder of Deeds and Register of Wills: Debbie Bates, Republican
Sheriff: Christopher Rosler, Republican
Treasurer: Brian T. Field, Republican

Healthcare services
Wayne County is served by the Wayne Memorial Health System. The Health System consists of Wayne Memorial Hospital in Honesdale and several other subsidiaries and/or affiliates. In addition, the community has a number of physicians and other professionals providing needed care. The Farview State Hospital is located in Farview.

Emergency services
Paramedic services are provided by three different agencies:
Wayne Ambulance, an affiliate of Lackawanna Ambulance (based in Scranton) which is owned by Community Health Systems, provides advanced life support and basic life support services to most of Wayne County, from a base in Honesdale.
Cottage Hose Company / Mobile 9, based in Carbondale, Lackawanna County, provides advanced life support to all of Wayne County, as well as basic life support as a mutual aid or private service. They primarily respond to calls in Waymart and South Canaan and Clinton Townships, as this area adjoins their primary service area. They also service Forest City, Pennsylvania, which is located in Susquehanna County but dispatched through Wayne County due to their coverage of Browndale.
Pike County Advanced Life Support / Mobile 401, has a sub-station in Hawley, provides Advanced Life Support services to a small western part of the Wayne County, including Hawley and Palmyra Township
BLS services are provided as dispatched through the Wayne County Communication Center. These agencies include:
Newfoundland Area Ambulance, a volunteer ambulance corps, provides basic life support services in Dreher Township, and portions of adjoining Sterling and Lehigh townships.
Hawley Ambulance & Rescue Company provides BLS services.
White Mills Community Ambulance provides BLS services.
Northern Wayne Fire Company provides BLS service from their station on Route 370 in Lakewood.
Maplewood Fire and Rescue provides QRS "quick response service" to all medical calls in Lake townships.
Hamlin Fire and has three BLS units
Waymart EMS 
Damascus EMS 
Mt Pleastant EMS

Correctional facilities
The Federal Bureau of Prisons United States Penitentiary, Canaan is in Canaan Township, near Waymart.

Education

Public school districts
Forest City Regional (also in Lackawanna and Susquehanna)
North Pocono (also in Lackawanna)
Susquehanna Community (also in Susquehanna)
Wallenpaupack Area (also in Pike)
Wayne Highlands
Western Wayne

Private schools
There are five private or parochial schools in Wayne County:
Canaan Christian Academy in Varden
Damascus Christian Academy in Damascus
Saint Dominic's Academy in Honesdale
Serendipity Center Early Learning in Hawley
Sonshine Christian Preschool and Daycare in Hawley

Libraries
The Wayne Library Alliance operates seven public libraries throughout the county:
The Bethany Public Library in Bethany
Hamlin Community Library in Hamlin
The Hawley Public Library in Hawley
The Newfoundland Area Public Library in Newfoundland
The Northern Wayne Community Library in Lakewood
The Pleasant Mount Public Library in Pleasant Mount
The Wayne County Public Library in Honesdale

Communities

Under Pennsylvania law, there are four types of incorporated municipalities: boroughs, cities, townships, and one town.  Wayne County has only boroughs and townships. The latter type is classified based on population by the state government; all of its townships are second-class. A complete list of the county's municipalities follows:

Boroughs
Bethany
Hawley
Honesdale (county seat)
Prompton
Starrucca (established as Wayne Borough in 1853; renamed in 1873)
Waymart

Townships

Berlin
Buckingham
Canaan
Cherry Ridge
Clinton
Damascus
Dreher
Dyberry
Lake
Lebanon
Lehigh
Manchester
Mount Pleasant
Oregon
Palmyra
Paupack
Preston
Salem
Scott
South Canaan
Sterling
Texas

Census-designated places
In addition, Pennsylvania also has a few types of unincorporated communities, namely villages and private communities. Villages are unincorporated communities within a township, often defined by ZIP code boundaries, property deeds, and local consensus, but which have no official boundaries or population, unless they are also census-designated places (CDPs), geographical areas designated by the US Census Bureau for the purposes of compiling demographic data. Regardless of whether or not they are CDPs, however, they are not actual jurisdictions under Pennsylvania law. Private communities are gated settlements usually governed by a community association, which also often defines the boundaries of the community and may keep track of the number of its members. However, like villages, private communities have no official boundaries or populations, unless they are CDPs, and are never Pennsylvanian jurisdictions. The following is an incomplete list by necessity, but more complete lists of Wayne County's villages and private communities may be found in the corresponding township entry.

Big Bass Lake (mostly in Lackawanna County)
Gouldsboro (partially in Monroe County)
Pocono Springs
The Hideout
Wallenpaupack Lake Estates
White Mills

Unincorporated communities

Damascus
Equinunk
Galilee
Hamlin
Hollisterville
Jericho
Lake Ariel
Lake Como
Lakeville
Lakewood
Milanville
Newfoundland
Orson
Pleasant Mount
Poyntelle
Rileyville
South Sterling
Starlight
Tanners Falls

Population ranking
The population ranking of the following table is based on the 2010 census of Wayne County.

† county seat

See also

National Register of Historic Places listings in Wayne County, Pennsylvania

References

 
1798 establishments in Pennsylvania
Counties of Appalachia
Pocono Mountains
Populated places established in 1798